Ginger Baker at His Best was part of a set of four double albums consisting of selected individual and collective output of the British rock band  Cream and that of its three members. The albums were released in 1972.

The Cream album was entitled Heavy Cream, and featured illustrations of Eric Clapton, Baker and Jack Bruce. Three additional albums were devoted to each individual band member - Jack Bruce at His Best, Eric Clapton at His Best, and Ginger Baker at His Best.  The Baker album is drawn from his first two solo releases, Ginger Baker's Air Force and Ginger Baker's Air Force 2, as well as his work with Blind Faith. Between Baker's and Clapton's albums, the whole of the original Blind Faith album is covered.

Track listing 

Ginger Baker albums
1972 compilation albums
Polydor Records compilation albums